The Al Lucas Award is awarded to the Arena Football League Player of the Year by the Maxwell Football Club.  The award is named for Al Lucas, who died in an AFL game in 2005.

Previous winners

References

Arena Football League trophies and awards